Ann Dancing is an artwork created in 2007 by Julian Opie (born 1958, London) an English artist and former trustee of the Tate.  The electronic sculpture is located in Indianapolis, Indiana. It was removed from its base on August 20, 2008, for repairs, and was returned on October 31 of that year.

Description
The sculpture consists of four rectilinear panels of light-emitting diode (LED) screens that each display the same animated image in orange of a woman on all four panels.  The woman, "Ann," is wearing a sheath dress and sways from side to side in a dancing motion.   Ann either has pointed feet or is wearing high-heeled shoes.  She appears to have no clear hairstyle.

It is probable that the animated image of Ann dancing is computer generated from an internally housed computer located in the red brick base of the sculpture.

History and location

The sculpture was installed at the intersection of Massachusetts Avenue, Alabama Street, and  Vermont Street in Indianapolis from January to February, 2008. The sculpture is located directly in front of the Tavern at the Point (formerly Old Point Tavern) and was the first artwork installed on the Indianapolis Cultural Trail  at a total expense of $150,000.

The sculpture is visible in the Google Maps Street View, but only from the middle of the intersection .

—Julian Opie, 2008.

References

External links
Information about the Artwork
 Animated Artwork added to Cultural Trail (from indy.com) 
 “Ann Dancing” by internationally renowned artist Julian Opie a legacy of the popular 2007 public art exhibition (press release from the Indianapolis Cultural Trail) 
 Cultural Trail Gets Opie (from the blog onthecusp.org) 
 First permanent art installation along Indianapolis Cultural Trail is illuminated (from Public Art Indianapolis) 
 Opie Art Dancing on Mass Ave (from IBJ.com) 
 Public art debuts on Cultural Trail (from Indianapolis TV station WTHR) 

Images and Video of the Artwork
 Flickr Group for Julian Opie 
 YouTube video of Ann Dancing 

Descriptions and Opinions of the Artwork
 Ann dances ... and annoys by Lou Harry on the Indianapolis Business Journal's blog 
 Ann & Me by Noelle Pulliam on the Indianapolis Museum of Art's blog 

Contemporary works of art
Digital art
New media art
Outdoor sculptures in Indianapolis
Modernist sculpture
2007 sculptures
Digital artworks